The Tingzhou dialect is a group of Hakka dialects spoken in Longyan and Sanming (historically Tingzhou), southwestern Fujian. Tingzhou includes the Hakka dialects spoken in the counties originally under the jurisdiction of Tingzhou: Changting (Tingzhou), Ninghua, Qingliu, Liancheng, Wuping, Shanghang, Yongding and Mingxi. The Changting dialect is generally regarded as the representative dialect of this branch of Hakka.

References

See also
Changting dialect

Hakka Chinese